Staværing is a demonym in Norwegian, that may refer to:

 Someone from Stadsbygd
 Someone from Stavern